The Ultima Tower was a hypothetical supertall skyscraper, conceptualized and designed by American architect Eugene Tsui in 1991. It has been envisioned to be built in San Francisco, California  and could accommodate up to one million people. It is one of the tallest buildings/man-made structures ever conceived.

References

External links 
 The "Ultima" Tower, Two-mile High Sky City

Unbuilt buildings and structures in the United States
Proposed skyscrapers in the United States
Unbuilt skyscrapers